The Plain Dealer is a Restoration comedy by William Wycherley, first performed on 11 December 1676.  The play is based on Molière's Le Misanthrope, and is generally considered Wycherley's finest work along with The Country Wife.

The play was highly praised by John Dryden and John Dennis, though it was equally condemned for its obscenity by many. Throughout the eighteenth century it was performed in a bowdlerised version by Isaac Bickerstaffe.

The title character is Captain Manly, a sailor who doubts the motives of everyone he meets except for his sweetheart, Olivia, and his friend, Vernish.  When Olivia jilts him and marries Vernish, he attempts to gain revenge by sending a pageboy (who, unknown to him, is a girl in disguise and is in love with him) to seduce Olivia.  When the truth of the page's identity is discovered, Manly marries her instead.

The French philosopher, historian, and dramatist Voltaire adapted The Plain Dealer to make his own play, titled La Prude (The Prude).

Comments from 1911 Britannica:

Scarcely inferior to The Country Wife is The Plain Dealer — a play of which Voltaire said, "Je ne connais point de comédie chez les anciens ni chez les modernes où il y ait autant d'esprit." ("I know not of a single comedy of either the ancients or the moderns where there is so much wit.") This comedy had an immense influence, as regards manipulation of dialogue, upon all subsequent English comedies of repartee, and he who wants to trace the ancestry of Tony Lumpkin and Mrs Hardcastle (in She Stoops to Conquer by Oliver Goldsmith) has only to turn to Jerry Blackacre and his mother, while Manly (for whom Wycherley's early patron, the Duke of Montausier, sat), though he is perhaps overdone, has dominated this kind of stage character ever since. If but few readers know how constantly the blunt sententious utterances of this character are reappearing, not on the stage alone, but in the novel and even in poetry, it is because a play whose motive is monstrous and intolerable can only live in a monstrous and intolerable state of society; it is because Wycherley's genius was followed by Nemesis, who always dogs the footsteps of the denier of literary art. When Burns said: "The rank is but the guinea stamp, The man's the gowd for a' that"; when Sterne, in Tristram Shandy, said, "Honours, like impressions upon coin, may give an ideal and local value to a bit of base metal, but gold and silver will pass all the world over without any other recommendation than their own weight," what did these writers do but adopt—adopt without improving—Manly's fine saying to Freeman, in the first act: "I weigh the man, not his title; 'tis not the king's stamp can make the metal better or heavier"? And yet it is in the fourth and fifth acts that the coruscations of Wycherley's comic genius are the most dazzling; also, it is there that the licentiousness is the most astonishing. Not that the worst scenes in this play are really more wicked than the worst scenes in Vanbrugh's Relapse, but they are more seriously imagined. Being less humorous than Vanbrugh's scenes, they are more terribly and earnestly realistic; therefore they seem more wicked. They form indeed a striking instance of the folly of the artist who selects a story which cannot be actualized without hurting the finer instincts of human nature.

References

Restoration comedy
Plays by William Wycherley
1676 plays
Plays set in the 17th century
Plays based on works by Molière